Boneh-ye Dari (also Romanized as Boneh-ye Darī) is a village in Kuhestan Rural District, Rostaq District, Darab County, Fars Province, Iran. At the 2006 census, its population was 155, in 31 families.

References 

Populated places in Darab County